Kodino is a rural locality (a settlement) in Onezhsky District, Arkhangelsk Oblast, Russia. The population was 1,514 as of 2010. There are 20 streets.

Geography 
Kodino is located on the Kodina River, 103 km southeast of Onega (the district's administrative centre) by road.

References 

Rural localities in Onezhsky District